The Second Season of  singing reality show Dil Hai Hindustani premiered on 7 July 2018. The show was broadcast on StarPlus and streams on Hotstar. The show was hosted by Mukti Mohan and Raghav Juyal. Sunidhi Chauhan, Badshah and Pritam are judges in the show. The show was produced by Ranjeet Thakur and Hemant Ruprell under Frames Production. The season was won by Akshay Dhawan.

Top 4 Finalists

Top 6

Top 7

Top 8

Top 13

References

2018 Indian television seasons